The 1999–2000 First League of the Republika Srpska is the 5th season since establishment. Since Football Association of Republika Srpska is not a member of UEFA nor FIFA, league champion did not qualify for European tournament.

League table

See also
1999–2000 First League of Bosnia and Herzegovina

External links
 FSRS Official website

Srpska
1999–2000 in Bosnia and Herzegovina football
First League of the Republika Srpska seasons